Liao Hsing-chou (born 4 February 1970) is a Taiwanese weightlifter. He competed at the 1988 Summer Olympics and the 1996 Summer Olympics.

References

1970 births
Living people
Taiwanese male weightlifters
Olympic weightlifters of Taiwan
Weightlifters at the 1988 Summer Olympics
Weightlifters at the 1996 Summer Olympics
Place of birth missing (living people)
Asian Games medalists in weightlifting
Weightlifters at the 1990 Asian Games
Weightlifters at the 1994 Asian Games
Asian Games bronze medalists for Chinese Taipei
Medalists at the 1990 Asian Games
Medalists at the 1994 Asian Games
20th-century Taiwanese people